Epie (or Epie-Atissa) is a language spoken in Nigeria by the Epie-Atissa people.

Phonology

(The other approximants, are also nasalized in this position: see Edo language for a similar situation.) The inventory is:

References

Further reading

 Thomas, Elaine and Kay Williamson. 1967. "Wordlists of delta Edo: Epie, Engenni, Degema." In Occasional Papers 8, p. 105. Accra: Institute of African Studies, University of Ibadan.

Edoid languages